Verrucole Castle (Italian: Fortezza delle Verrucole) is a medieval fortress located in the Garfagnana region of Tuscany, Italy, in San Romano in Garfagnana comune, near the city of Lucca. It is 600 metres above sea level.

The fortress has recently undergone partial restoration. The territory of the fortress has been restored to give an understanding of the medieval way of life. The keep has undergone more considerable reconstruction with exhibits on different aspects of medieval life, including food, medicine, and warfare.

External links

 Photographs of Verrucole

Castles in Tuscany

Este residences